Miguel Linares Cólera (born 30 September 1982) is a Spanish former professional footballer who played as a striker.

Club career
Born in Zaragoza, Aragon, Linares began his career at Utebo FC of Tercera División. He spent the 2004–05 season with Real Zaragoza B in the Segunda División B and had a brief spell at SD Huesca before joining UD Barbastro in 2006, who were relegated from the third tier in his first campaign. 

In summer 2008, following a 34-goal haul, Linares moved outside his native region for the first time, joining CD Alcoyano. He contributed 15 goals from 35 matches in his only season as the Valencians won their group, eventually falling short in the promotion play-offs to Segunda División.

Linares signed a two-year deal with UD Salamanca on 22 June 2009. After one season at the Estadio Helmántico – making his professional debut on 30 August in a 1–0 away win against Cádiz CF at the age of 26 years and 11 months– he transferred to fellow league team Elche CF. The latter won the championship and promotion to La Liga in 2013, though he made only eight appearances and scored once; during his tenure, he suffered two consecutive anterior cruciate ligament injuries to his right knee.

Following this, Linares remained in the second tier with Recreativo de Huelva, and in 2014 the 32-year-old moved to Real Oviedo one league down. He was top scorer with 30 goals (31 across all competitions) in 39 games as the Asturians won the title in 2014–15, including two in a 3–0 win over Gimnàstic de Tarragona in the second leg of the play-off final on 10 June 2015. The previous October/November, he had scored hat-tricks in consecutive home defeats of Celta de Vigo B, CD Lealtad and Real Murcia.

On 17 June 2018, Linares joined CF Reus Deportiu in the second division after agreeing to a one-year contract. Halfway through the season, however, he left the club after it was expelled from the Liga de Fútbol Profesional due to unpaid wages, joining Real Zaragoza shortly after.

Linares retired in January 2022 at the age of 39, after two years at lower-league side SD Ejea where he failed to play a single competitive game due to another serious knee injury.

Career statistics

Club

Honours
Elche
Segunda División: 2012–13

Oviedo
Segunda División B: 2014–15

References

External links

1982 births
Living people
Spanish footballers
Footballers from Zaragoza
Association football forwards
Segunda División players
Segunda División B players
Tercera División players
Real Zaragoza B players
SD Huesca footballers
UD Barbastro players
CD Alcoyano footballers
UD Salamanca players
Elche CF players
Recreativo de Huelva players
Real Oviedo players
CF Reus Deportiu players
Real Zaragoza players
SD Ejea players